Euphorticus is a genus of beetles in the family Carabidae, containing the following species:

 Euphorticus leucoscelis (Bates, 1878)
 Euphorticus occidentalis G. Horn, 1891
 Euphorticus pubescens (Dejean, 1831)

References

Lebiinae